Coxy may refer to:

 Andrew "Coxy" Cox, a member of The Fauves, an Australian rock band
 Geoff Cox (born 1951), Australian musician and media personality
 Paul Cox (footballer) (born 1972), English football manager and former player
 Sara Cox (born 1974), English broadcaster who played "Nurse Coxy" on the British radio show Sunday Surgery

Hypocorisms
Lists of people by nickname